Before the Acts of Union 1707, the barons of the shire of Linlithgow elected commissioners to represent them in the unicameral Parliament of Scotland and in the Convention of the Estates.

From 1708 Linlithgowshire was represented by one Member of Parliament in the House of Commons of Great Britain.

List of shire commissioners

 1628–29: Thomas Dalyell of Binns 
 1629: Robert Hamilton of Bathgate 
 1628-33: Sir Walter Dundas of that Ilk 
 1628–1633, 1630 (convention), 1639: William Drummond of Riccarton 
 1639–41, 1643–44, 1650: George Dundas of that Ilk   
 1640–41: Sir John Stirling of Garden 
 1643–44: Cochran of Barbachla 
 1644, 1644–47: Samuel Drummond of Carlowrie 
 1644, 1644–47, 1648: Laird of Maner (George Dundas) 
 1645–46: Laird of Boighall (Hamilton)   
 1646–47, 1648: Laird of Binning (Hamilton)  
 1649: William Sandilands of Hilderston  
 1649–50: George Dundas of Duddingston  
 1661–63, 1667 (convention): Sir Archibald Stirling of Garden, Lord Garden, Senator of College of Justice 
 1661, 1685–86, 1689 (convention), 1689–98: Thomas Drummond of Riccarton (died c.1699)  
 1665 (convention), 1667 (convention), 1669–74: Sir Walter Seton of Abercorn
 1669-74: James Dundas of Morton 
 1678 (convention), 1681–82, 1685–85 Tam Dalyell of the Binns (died 1685)
 1678 (convention): William Sharp of Houston 
 1681–82: John Hope of Hopeton 
 1686, 1689 (convention), 1689–1701, 1702–03: Patrick Murray of Livingston (died c.1703)
 1700–02, 1703–07: Thomas Sharp of Houston   
 1702–03: Charles Hope of Hopeton (died c.1703)
 1704–07: John Montgomerie of Wrae

References

See also
 List of constituencies in the Parliament of Scotland at the time of the Union

Constituencies of the Parliament of Scotland (to 1707)
Constituencies disestablished in 1707
Politics of West Lothian
1707 disestablishments in Scotland
History of West Lothian